Fakfak Regency - formerly spelt "Fak-Fak" - is a regency of West Papua province of Indonesia. It covers an area of 14,320 km2, and had a population of 66,828 at the 2010 Census and 87,894 at the 2020 Census. The administrative centre is the town of Fakfak.

Geography
Fakfak Regency was divided in 2002 into a reduced Fakfak Regency and a new Kaimana Regency, created by Law No. 26 of 2002, to be precise dated 12 November 2002. The regency is geographically located at 131º 531 0311 east longitude - 133º 291 1911 east longitude and 2º 301 5811 – 3º 571 5111 LS. The land area of ​​Fakfak Regency, following the division of 2002, is 14,320 km2, consisting originally of 4 (four districts) which were later divided into 9 (nine) districts (sub-divided into 106 villages) in 2004, and subsequently re-divided into 17 districts (sub-divided into 149 villages), of which the largest of Karas Distrik.

Administrative Districts
At the 2010 Census, the regency comprised nine districts (distrik), but subsequently eight additional districts have been created by splitting the original districts. These are tabulated below with their areas and their populations at the 2010 Census and the 2020 Census. The table also includes the locations of the district administrative centres, the number of administrative villages (142 rural desa and 7 urban kelurahan(a) in total) and offshore islands in each district, and its post code.

Note: (a) the 7 kelurahan are Fakfak Selatan (South Fakfak) and Fakfak Utara (North Fakfak) in Fakfak District, Danawaria in Fakfak Tengah District, Kokas Kota (Kokas Town) in Kokas District, and Dulanpokpok, Wagom and Wagom Utara in Pariwari District. (b) the populations of the eight new districts in 2010 are included in the figures for the original districts from which each was later split off. (c) the number of offshore islands in each of the eight new districts are included in the figures for the original districts from which each was later split off.

Demographics 
The majority of the population is Muslim, the level of assimilation with the outside world has been very high for a long time (before Dutch colonization). In Fakfak Regency, there are old mosques from the 17th century, one of which is Patimburak Old Mosque which is located in Kokas District. This shows that Islam has entered Papua before the 17th century, some experts predict that it has been in since the 15th century. The people of Fakfak Regency highly uphold religious values, as evidenced by the creation of a slogan that has been around for generations in Fakfak Regency, namely Satu Tungku Tiga Batu. Based on data from Central Bureau of Statistics Fakfak Regency in 2020 which implements Islam, namely 57.79%, then Christian as much as 42.17% (Protestant 22.24% &  Catholic 19.92%) and Buddhist Hindu around 0.03%. One of the largest churches in Fakfak is the Santo Yosep Fakfak Church.

Industries 
Fakfak Regency has plans for industrial development, including:
 PT. Priskila Prima Makmur (still a plan 2023)
 GEA RSA (the electronics industry) (still a plan 2026)

References

External links
Statistics publications from Statistics Indonesia (BPS)

Regencies of West Papua (province)